Pniewy  is a settlement in the administrative district of Gmina Kalisz Pomorski, within Drawsko County, West Pomeranian Voivodeship, in north-western Poland.

History
In the 10th century the area became part of the emerging Polish state and then formed part of Poland, and later on it also was part of Prussia, and Germany. After Germany's defeat in World War II, in 1945, the area became again part of Poland.

References

Pniewy